Hataz (c. 575) was a King of the Kingdom of Aksum. He is primarily known through the coins that were minted during his reign, some of which call him "Iathlia".

References

Kings of Axum
6th-century monarchs in Africa